Tomás Manuel Inguana (born 13 January 1973 in Maputo) is a retired Mozambican football defender.

Career
During his career he played for Desportivo de Maputo, Ferroviário, Orlando Pirates, AmaZulu, Nam Dinh and Wits University.

Inguana was capped for the Mozambique between 1995 and 2004 earning 33 caps and scoring two goals, he also represented his national at two Africa Cup of Nations tournaments in 1996 and 1998.

After retiring from playing, Inguane went into football administration. He is now a director of Grupo Desportivo de Maputo.

References

External links
 
 

1973 births
Living people
Sportspeople from Maputo
Mozambican footballers
GD Maputo players
Clube Ferroviário de Maputo footballers
1996 African Cup of Nations players
1998 African Cup of Nations players
Mozambican expatriate footballers
Orlando Pirates F.C. players
Mozambican expatriate sportspeople in South Africa
Expatriate soccer players in South Africa
Mozambique international footballers
AmaZulu F.C. players
Bidvest Wits F.C. players
Expatriate footballers in Vietnam
Association football defenders